Assembly Hall, also known as Serio House, de France House, and Fletcher's Tavern is a small tavern built in 1808 in Washington, Mississippi. It was listed on the National Register of Historic Places in 1978 and designated a Mississippi Landmark on March 21, 1995.

History
In 1802 a political rivalry between the Democratic-Republican Party and the Federalist Party led to the relocation of Mississippi's then territorial capital. The Democrat-Republican government elected to move the capital from the Federalist-leaning Natchez, Mississippi to the more rural Washington, Mississippi; however, no capitol building was ever built. Meetings of the state's general assembly were held in the tavern, then owned by Charles de France. Upon admission of the state in 1817, the first state convention was held in the tavern, while all subsequent conventions before 1820 were held in Natchez.

References

Commercial buildings on the National Register of Historic Places in Mississippi
Commercial buildings completed in 1808
Mississippi Landmarks
National Register of Historic Places in Adams County, Mississippi
Taverns in the United States
Former state capitols in the United States
Government of Mississippi
Drinking establishments on the National Register of Historic Places